The Muel Dam was a Roman gravity dam in Zaragoza province, Aragon, Spain, dating to the 1st century AD.

See also 
 List of Roman dams and reservoirs
 Roman architecture
 Roman engineering

Notes

References 
 

Roman dams in Spain
Roman sites in Spain
Archaeological sites in Spain
Gravity dams
Province of Zaragoza